Donnna Miller (née Black; born September 7, 1965) is a politician currently serving as a Cook County commissioner, representing the board's  6th district.

Early life and career
Miller was born "Donna Lynne Black" on September 7, 1965. She spent most of her youth living in Chicago.

Miller attended Odgen Elementrary in Chicago. Miller graduated from Lane Technical High School in 1983. She graduated from Howard University in 1987 with a bachelor degree in business administration. She later took graduate business courses at Pepperdine University in 1992.

In the fall of 2001, Miller married David E. Miller at St. Thomas Episcopal Church in Chicago. She adopted his surname.

Miller worked as a health care consultant, and account specialist. She has decades of experience in the biotech pharmaceutical healthcare industry.

Miller served on the board of Planned Parenthood Illinois beginning in 2012, serving as its board chair in 2017 and 2018. She was also a board member of Planned Parenthood Illinois Action beginning in 2012, and its board chair from 2015 through 2017.

Miller worked with congresswoman Robin Kelly, serving on her 2nd Congressional District Healthcare Task Force and co-chairing the Robin Kelly Annual Golf Event from 2014 through 2017.

Miller served as vice-president of Illinois Democratic Women.

Miller served as a legislative liaison to the Alliance of Illinois State Dental Society.

Miller served as a board member for the Christian Community Health Center.

Miller served as a mentor for Jobs for Youth and the MIKVA Challenge.

Miller served as a member of the Walgreens HIV Task Force, Healthcare Business Women's Association, League of Women Voters, National Sales Network, Professional Women's Network.

Miller worked as Director of Multi Cultural Markets with the American Heart Association.

Miller supported Hillary Clinton in her campaign for president in 2016, serving with Hillary Clinton Super Volunteers in from 2014 through 2016 and serving on the Illinois Clinton Leadership Team in 2015 and 2016. Miller was a member of the Democratic National Committee Rules Committee for the 2016 Democratic National Convention.

2012 state senate campaign
In 2012, Miller ran for the Democratic nomination for the 15th district of Illinois State Senate to replace outgoing state senator James Meeks. Miller's opponents were businessman and former NFL player Napoleon Harris and South Holland deputy village manager Patricia Mahon.

Miller received the nominations of the Illinois AFL–CIO, two major teacher's unions, and the Democratic organizations of the Bloom and Crete townships.

Napoleon Harris ultimately won the Democratic nomination, with Miller placing second. Harris went on to win the general election unopposed.

Cook County Commissioner

In 2022 Miller was elected to a second term as Cook County Commissioner serving the 6th district.

In 2018, Miller ran for the 6th district seat on the Cook County Board of Commissioners. The seat had been filled by Edward Moody following the 2016 death in office of commissioner Joan Patricia Murphy. Moody opted not to seek election to a full term.

Miller's opponents in the Democratic primary was the deceased commissioner Murphy's daughter, Patricia Joan Murphy, and Crestwood mayor Lou Presta.

In the Democratic primary, Miller's candidacy received the endorsements of the Chicago Tribune, Chicago Sun-Times, SEIU, United Food and Commercial Workers, Democracy for America, National Association of Social Workers-Illinois Council, Danny K. Davis, Robin Kelly, Jan Schakowsky, and  Raja Krishnamoorthi.

Miller's opponent Presta was endorsed by the Chicago Federation of Labor, nine democratic committeepeople, and 25 of the district's 31 mayors. Presta attracted criticism for proposing the sale of Cook County Forest Preserves land to fix the county's budget, and also attracted negative press for personal debt owed to the Internal Revenue Service.

Miller won the primary, and went on to win the general election unopposed.

Personal life
Miller is married to Dr. David E. Miller and has two children, sons Daniel and Donovan. Miller's husband spent a decade as an Illinois state representative.

Miller resides in Lynwood, Illinois.

Electoral history

Illinois State Senate

Cook County Board of Commissioners

References

Illinois Democrats
Members of the Cook County Board of Commissioners
1965 births
Howard University alumni
African-American people in Illinois politics
Women in Illinois politics
Living people
21st-century African-American people
20th-century African-American people
20th-century African-American women
21st-century African-American women